This is a list of retailers in New Zealand.

This list is not exhaustive; it contains notable chains and franchises that have or had bricks and mortar shops, usually in multiple locations.

References

See also

 List of shopping centres in New Zealand
 Retailing in New Zealand
 Hospitality industry in New Zealand

 
Lists of retailers